Stately Pleasure Dome is the unofficial name for the prominent south-southwestern portion of Polly Dome, a granite dome on the northwest side of Tenaya Lake and Tioga Road in the Yosemite high country. Stately Pleasure Dome consists of glaciated and exfoliated granite rock that rises steeply   from the lake shore; the very steep east side of the dome is popular with rock climbers, who gave the dome its name.

The name presumably comes from the poem Kubla Khan by Samuel Taylor Coleridge:

Climbing

The south face of the formation is popular with rock climbers and has over twenty multi-pitch slab climbs many of them easy or moderate.

References

Granite domes of Yosemite National Park
Landforms of Tuolumne County, California
Hills of California